The New York Mets are a Major League Baseball (MLB) franchise based in Queens, in New York City. They play in the National League East division. In the team's history (1962–), the Mets have employed 12 general managers (GMs). The GM controls player transactions, hiring and firing of the coaching staff, and negotiates with players and agents regarding contracts. The longest-tenured GM is Frank Cashen, who held the position for 11 years (1980–1990). The Mets owner is Steve Cohen.

Table key

Owners

Historical majority shareholders
Joan Whitney Payson (1962–1975)
Charles Shipman Payson (1975–1980)
Doubleday & Co. (1980–1986)
Nelson Doubleday Jr. & Fred Wilpon (1986–2002)
Sterling Equities (2002–2020)
Steven A. Cohen (2020–present)

Current ownership
As of October 30, 2020, Steve Cohen is the owner of the Mets, with a 95% majority share with the team, with the Wilpons and Katz families retaining a 5% stake

General managers

Other executives
 Rubén Amaro Jr.
 Chris Christie
 Paul DePodesta
 M. Donald Grant
 Whitey Herzog
 Gerry Hunsicker
 Saul Katz
 Wid Matthews
 Kevin Morgan
 J. P. Ricciardi
 Jeff Wilpon
 Jack Zduriencik

Footnotes
#: A running total of the number of Mets' GMs. Thus, any GM who has two or more separate terms is only counted once.
 Assistant GM John Ricco served as interim GM following the dismissal of Minaya on October 4, 2010. He returned to Asst. GM on October 29, when Alderson was hired.

References

 
 
New York Mets
Owners and executives